The 1922 Mississippi A&M Aggies baseball team represented the Mississippi Aggies of Mississippi A&M in the 1922 NCAA baseball season. The team featured Cotton Klindworth.

Schedule and results

References

Mississippi State Bulldogs
Mississippi State Bulldogs baseball seasons
Southern Conference baseball champion seasons
1922 in sports in Mississippi